The 2005–06 Clermont Foot season was the club's 94th season in existence and the club's fourth consecutive season in the second division of French football. In addition to the domestic league, Clermont participated in this season's edition of the Coupe de France and Coupe de la Ligue. The season covered the period from 1 July 2005 to 30 June 2006.

Players

Current squad

Transfers

In

Out

Pre-season and friendlies

Competitions

Overview

Ligue 2

League table

Results summary

Results by round

Matches

Coupe de France

Coupe de la Ligue

Statistics

Goalscorers

Source:

References

External links

Clermont Foot seasons
Clermont Foot